Bebearia zonara, the light brown forester, is a butterfly in the family Nymphalidae. It is found in Sierra Leone, Liberia, Ivory Coast, Ghana, Nigeria, Cameroon, Bioko, Gabon, the Republic of the Congo, the Central African Republic, the Democratic Republic of the Congo (Mayumbe, Ubangi, Mongala, Uele, Ituri, Tshopo, Equateur, Cataractes, Kasai, Sankuru and Lualaba) and Uganda (Semuliki National Park and Semliki-Toro Reserve). The habitat consists of forests.

The larvae feed on Hypselodelphys species.

References

Butterflies described in 1871
zonara
Butterflies of Africa
Taxa named by Arthur Gardiner Butler